Peter Kattuk (2 June 1950 – 20 November 2019) was a Canadian politician from Nunavut.

Early life 
He was born in the Belcher Islands, Northwest Territories (now Nunavut) and lived in Sanikiluaq.

Career 
He was the Member of the Legislative Assembly (MLA) for the electoral district of Hudson Bay in the Legislative Assembly of Nunavut from 1999 to 2008.

Prior to becoming an MLA, Kattuk was the mayor of Sanikiluaq and worked with local organizations.

Death 
He died in 2019 at the age of 69.

References

1950 births
2019 deaths
Inuit from the Northwest Territories
Inuit politicians
Members of the Legislative Assembly of Nunavut
21st-century Canadian politicians
Mayors of places in Nunavut
People from Sanikiluaq
Inuit from Nunavut